The 1983 Kentucky Wildcats football team represented the University of Kentucky in the 1983 NCAA Division I-A football season. The Wildcats scored 228 points while allowing 237 points.

After a 4–0 start, Kentucky finished the regular season 6–4–1 before playing in the 1983 Hall of Fame Classic and losing to No 18 West Virginia, 20–16. The improvement from 1982's 0–10–1 mark was, at the time, an NCAA record for most improvement in wins from one season to the next.

Schedule

Team players in the 1984 NFL Draft

References

Kentucky
Kentucky Wildcats football seasons
Kentucky Wildcats football